Daniel Bednárik (born 10 March 1994) is a Slovak football defender who currently plays for the Fortuna Liga club AS Trenčín.

Club career
He made his professional debut for AS Trenčín senior side on 2 March 2013 in the Corgoň Liga match against Spartak Myjava.

Career statistics

External links
AS Trenčín profile
Corgoň Liga profile

References

1994 births
Living people
Slovak footballers
Association football defenders
AS Trenčín players
Slovak Super Liga players